Night Flight to Dakar is an album by saxophonists Al Cohn and Billy Mitchell, pianist Dolo Coker, bassist Leroy Vinnegar and drummer Frank Butler recorded in Dakar in 1980 for Xanadu Records.

Reception 

The Allmusic review by Scott Yanow stated "The performances may have been recorded during an African tour but the music is very much American bop with heated versions of "Blues Up and Down," "Sweet Senegalese Brown" and "The King" featuring the tenors in competitive form".

Track listing 
 "Night Flight to Dakar" (Dolo Coker) – 8:43
 "Don't Let the Sun Catch You Cryin' (Joe Greene) – 6:43
 "Blues Up and Down" (Gene Ammons, Sonny Stitt) – 9:13
 "Sweet Senegelese Brown" (Billy Mitchell) – 12:10
 "The King" (Count Basie) – 10:30

Personnel 
Al Cohn, Billy Mitchell – tenor saxophone
Dolo Coker – piano
Leroy Vinnegar – bass
Frank Butler – drums

References 

1982 live albums
Xanadu Records live albums
Billy Mitchell (jazz musician) live albums
Al Cohn live albums
Dolo Coker live albums
Albums produced by Don Schlitten